{{DISPLAYTITLE:C2H4O}}
The molecular formula C2H4O (molar mass: 44.05 g/mol, exact mass: 44.0262 u) may refer to:

 Acetaldehyde (ethanal)
 Ethenol (vinyl alcohol)
 Ethylene oxide (epoxyethane, oxirane)